Fight Softly is the third full-length album released by the New Zealand based band The Ruby Suns.

Track listing

Release details

References

External links
Fight Softly on Myspace

2010 albums
The Ruby Suns albums